John Maurice Roëves (19 March 1937 – 14 July 2020) was a Scottish actor. He appeared in over 120 film and television roles, in both the United Kingdom and the United States. His breakthrough performance was as Stephen Dedalus in the 1967 film adaptation of James Joyce's Ulysses. He was a regular fixture on BBC and BBC Scotland programmes, often portraying what The Guardian called "tough guys, steely villains or stalwart military figures with directness, authenticity and spiky energy".

Early life and education 
Roëves was born in Sunderland to Rhoda (nee Laydon) and Percival Roëves. When he was six the family moved to Glasgow, where he was raised from then on. He left Hyndland Secondary School early to help his father, and undertook National Service in the Royal Scots Greys, where he was a tank mechanic. After he left the Army he studied at the College of Dramatic Art at the Royal Conservatoire of Scotland, where he won a Gold Medal for acting.

Career
Roëves took to the stage at the Citizens Theatre in Glasgow in the 1960s in a production of The Merchant of Venice.

Roëves's first notable roles were in films. He played the leading role of Stephen Dedalus in the film adaptation of James Joyce's Ulysses (1967) and also appeared in Oh! What a Lovely War (1969). Other films he acted in include A Day at the Beach (1970), The Eagle Has Landed (1976), Hidden Agenda (1990), The Last of the Mohicans (1992), Judge Dredd (1995), The Acid House (1998) and Beautiful Creatures (2000). In 2003 he appeared in May Miles Thomas's film Solid Air. His final film role was in Justin Kurzel's Macbeth (2015), playing Menteith.

His first television role was in the series Scobie in September in 1969. He played a schoolmaster in Out of the Unknown, in the episode "Taste of Evil" in 1971. A short thriller series called The Scobie Man followed in 1972. He then went on to appear in The Sweeney (1975), Danger UXB (1979), The Nightmare Man (1981), the Doctor Who serial The Caves of Androzani (1984), Days of Our Lives (1986), North and South (1985), Tutti Frutti (1987), Rab C. Nesbitt (1990), The New Statesman (1990), Spender (1991), Star Trek: The Next Generation (1993), the BBC adaptation of Vanity Fair (1998), EastEnders (2003), A Touch of Frost (2003) and Skins (2008). He played Chief Superintendent David Duckenfield in the television film Hillsborough (1996). In 2006 he appeared in the BBC docudrama Surviving Disasters, portraying Sir Matt Busby in the story of the Munich air disaster. He starred as Robert Henderson in BBC Scotland's drama River City. He appeared as a retired police superintendent in Southcliffe (episode 3, "Sorrow's Child").

Last years and death
In 2014 he stated that he had moved to Nottinghamshire with his wife, Vanessa Rawlings-Jackson. They also spent part of each year at a condo in Santa Fe, New Mexico.

On 15 July 2020 it was announced that Roëves had died at the age of 83, after a period of ill health.

Partial filmography

 The Fighting Prince of Donegal (1966) - Martin
 Ulysses (1967) - Stephen Dedalus
 Oh! What a Lovely War (1969) - George Patrick Michael Smith
 A Day at the Beach (1970) - Nicholas
 When Eight Bells Toll (1971) - Lt. Williams - Helicopter Pilot
 Young Winston (1972) - Brockie
 The Eagle Has Landed (1976) - Maj. Corcoran 
 Danger UXB (1979) - Sergeant James
 S.O.S. Titanic (1979, TV Movie) - Leading Stoker: Fred Barret
 Outland (1981) - First Victim (uncredited)
 Escape to Victory(1981) - Captain Pyrie 
 Inside the Third Reich (1982, TV Movie) - Rudolf Hess
 Who Dares Wins (1982) - Maj. Steele 
 North and South (1986, TV Mini-Series) - Shain
 Tutti Frutti (1987) - Vincent Diver
 The Play on One: Unreported Incident (1988) - Jack Lawrence
 Hidden Agenda (1990) - Harris
 The Big Man (1990) - Cam Colvin
 The Last of the Mohicans (1992) - Col. Edmund Munro
 Judge Dredd (1995) - Miller
 Guardians (1996) - Sergeant Reed
 The Acid House (1998) - God (segment "The Granton Star Cause") / Drunk (segment "A Soft Touch") / Priest (segment "The Acid House")
 Forgive and Forget (2000, TV Movie) - Michael O'Neil
 Beautiful Creatures (2000) - Ronnie McMinn
 Solid Air (2003) - Robert Houston
 William and Mary (TV series) (2004) - Ally Gilcrest
 The Dark (2005) - Dafydd
 Hallam Foe (2007) - Raymond
 Fast Track: No Limits (2008) - Schmitty
 The Damned United (2009) - Jimmy Gordon
 Brighton Rock (2010) - Chief Inspector
 Harrigan (2013) - Billy Davidson
 Luna (2014) - Jacob As The Doctor
 Macbeth'' (2015) - Menteith

References

External links

2012 Interview with Maurice Roeves
Maurice Roëves (Aveleyman)

1937 births
2020 deaths
20th-century British Army personnel
20th-century Scottish male actors
21st-century Scottish male actors
Actors from County Durham
Alumni of the Royal Conservatoire of Scotland
Male actors from Glasgow
People from Sunderland
Male actors from Tyne and Wear
Royal Scots Greys soldiers
Scottish male film actors
Scottish male television actors